Downing station, also known as the Depot Museum, is a historic train station located at Downing, Schuyler County, Missouri. It was built in 1872 by the Keokuk & Western Railroad. It is a one-story, frame building with board and batten siding.  The building features a gable roof with wide overhanging eaves and ornate cross stickwork brackets.  It was moved to its present location in 1976, and houses a local history museum.

It was added to the National Register of Historic Places in 1983 as the Downing Railroad Depot.

References

History museums in Missouri
Railway stations on the National Register of Historic Places in Missouri
Railway stations in the United States opened in 1872
National Register of Historic Places in Schuyler County, Missouri
Former Chicago, Burlington and Quincy Railroad stations
Former railway stations in Missouri